Jin Yaqin (1925 – 23 June 2016), also known by her stage name Bai Wei, was a Chinese actress.

Jin won the 25th Golden Rooster Award for Best Actress, 18th Tokyo International Film Festival - Best Actress and 7th Chinese Film Media Award for Best Actress for her role in 2005 film You and Me.

Life
Jin was born in Yimianpo Town of Shangzhi city, Heilongjiang province, during the Republic of China in 1925.

Jin worked in Home Troupe between 1943 and 1945, she appeared in The Thunderstorm and The Sunrise as Si Feng and Chen Bailu respectively, both were Cao Yu's writings.

In 1949, Jin attended North China University and she was transferred to Central Academy of Drama in 1950. After graduating in 1952 she was assigned to Beijing People's Art Theatre as an actress. During Jin worked in Beijing People's Art Theatre, she starred in many dramas, such as Zhao Xiaolan, Teahouse, Rickshaw Boy and Dragon Beard Ditch, which were written by Lao She. Jin retired in 1988.

After the Chinese economic reform, Jin acted in the historical film Du Shiniang, adapted from Feng Menglong's classical novel Stories to Caution the World.

In 1987, Jin played the character Zhao Momo in Dream of the Red Chamber, a historical television series starring Chen Xiaoxu, Deng Jie and Ouyang Fenqiang, based on the novel by the same name by Cao Xueqin.

Jin participated in Idler: Sister Ma (1999) and Chinese Communist Party Member: Sister Ma (2002) as Grandmother Liu, sitcoms directed by Ying Da, the former husband of Song Dandan.

In 2005, Jin played the role of grandmother in Ma Liwen's film You and Me, for which she won the Best Actress at the 25th Golden Rooster Awards, Best Actress Award at the 18th Tokyo International Film Festival and Best Actress Award at the 7th Chinese Film Media Awards.

In 2008, Jin filmed in Wheat, a historical film starring Fan Bingbing, Wang Xueqi and Wang Zhiwen.

In 2010, Jin was employed as the choreographer of the film The Flowers of War by Zhang Yimou.

Jin died on 23 June 2016.

Personal life
Jin met and married Niu Xingli; January 1928–December 31, 2009) in 1950s, he was also an actor from Beijing People's Art Theatre.

Works

Film

Television

Drama
 The Thunderstorm
 The Sunrise
 Zhao Xiaolan
 Teahouse
 Rickshaw Boy
 Dragon Beard Ditch

Awards

References

External links

1925 births
2016 deaths
Central Academy of Drama alumni
Actresses from Harbin
Chinese film actresses
Chinese television actresses
20th-century Chinese actresses
21st-century Chinese actresses